Claire Hennessy is the Irish author of several young adult novels. She was born in Dublin in 1986 and attended Trinity College Dublin, where she was elected a scholar and completed a BA in History and English Literature and master's degrees in Popular Literature and Creative Writing. She teaches creative writing workshops and co-founded a creative writing school in Dublin. She also works as an editor and co-founded a literary journal in 2015.

Books
 Dear Diary... (2000)
 Being Her Sister (2001)
 Memories (2002)
 Stereotype (2003)
 Good Girls Don't (2004)
 Afterwards (2005)
 Girls on the Verge: the Claire Hennessy collection (2005)
 That Girl (2007)
 Big Picture (2008)
 Every Summer (2009)
 Seeds of Liberty (2014)
 Nothing Tastes as Good (2016)
 Like Other Girls (2017)

See also
 Ó hAonghusa

External links
Claire Hennessy
Books at Poolbeg Press website
Review in the Irish Times

References

Irish children's writers
1986 births
Writers from Dublin (city)
Alumni of Trinity College Dublin
Living people
Irish writers of young adult literature
Irish women children's writers
Irish women novelists
21st-century Irish novelists
21st-century Irish women writers
Women writers of young adult literature
Irish LGBT writers
Scholars of Trinity College Dublin
21st-century LGBT people